The Develo (デベロ) is an official Japanese PC Engine hobbyist development accessory for NEC's console. It includes a C compiler and an assembler. Some games made with this kit were published on demo discs, such as Frisbee Ken John.

NEC consoles
Video game development software